Mbulu District is one of the six districts of the Manyara Region of Tanzania. It is bordered to the north by the Arusha Region and Lake Eyasi, to the east by the Babati Rural District, to the south by the Hanang District, and to the west by the Singida Region.

According to the 2002 Tanzania National Census, Mbulu District had a population of 237,882 inhabitants. According to the 2012 Tanzania National Census, the population of Mbulu District was 320,279.

The District Commissioner is Chelestino Mofugo. Mbulu District is, since the 2015 general election, divided into two election counties: Mbulu Mjini and Mbulu Vijijini.

The 2015-2020 members of parliaments are Zacharias Isaay (CCM) and Flatei Massay (CCM), for Mbulu Mjini and Mbulu Vijijini respectively.

The District is inhabited by people of different ethnic affiliations, especially the Iraqw people who are some of the earliest agro-pastoralists to migrate to what is now the Republic of Tanzania. Other native tribes are the Wahatzabeti living in Yaeda Chini, living a primitive life, and the Datooga people living in Mbulu Vijijini. People engage mainly in agriculture, keeping livestock and farming activities. There is plantation of onions in Bashay and wheat in many places.

The Mbulu District is located in the Mbulu Highlands, with forested mountains like Mount Guwang which are attractive to tourists. There's also a hot spring in Hhaynu. Lake Manyara National Park is partly in Mbulu District where tourists can come and visit. The Sanu Park Inn Lodge in Mbulu town provides accommodations for visitors.

Mbulu town has the Nyerere Stadium in Sanu Mbulu, the biggest stadium in whole Manyara Region for football and marathon. One of biggest hospitals in northern Tanzania is found in Mbulu: the Haydom Lutheran Hospital.

Administrative subdivisions
As of 2012, Mbulu District was administratively divided into 32 wards.

Wards

 Ayamaami
 Ayamohe
 Bargish
 Bashay
 Daudi
 Dinamu
 Dongobesh
 Endagikot
 Endamilay
 Eshkesh
 Gehandu
 Geterer
 Gidihim
 Gunyoda
 Hayderer
 Haydom
 Imboru
 Kainam
 Maghang
 Marang
 Maretadu
 Masieda
 Masqaroda
 Murray
 Nahasey
 Nambis
 Sanu Baray
 Tlawi
 Tumati
 Uhuru
 Yaeda Ampa
 Yaeda Chini

The district headquarters at Mbulu is said to have started in 1905.

References

External links
Mbulu District Homepage for the 2002 Tanzania National Census
Tanzanian Government Directory Database

 
Districts of Manyara Region